Thomas Ransom may refer to:

 Thomas E. G. Ransom (1834–1864), surveyor, civil engineer and general in the Union Army during the American Civil War
 Thomas Ransom (coach) (1870–1946), American football and basketball coach in the United States